Pseudoangustidontus, meaning  “false narrow toothed”, is a genus of enigmatic arthropod from the Lower Ordovician of Morocco. This animal is only known from the Fezouata Formation, a fossil site in Morocco that is of Lagerstätte status, meaning that the fossils from this site are exceptionally preserved. The only known fossils of this genus are isolated appendages that bore copious amounts of spines. Because of this, the taxonomy of this arthropod remains a heated debate, with possible suggestions of this creatures affinity being with the Eurypterids, Radiodonts, or the Crustaceans.

References 

Fossils of Morocco